Gary Day (born 10 November 1941) is a New Zealand former actor, playwright and lighting director who has appeared in Australian television police drama series, including Homicide and Murder Call.

Television 
Day worked as a male model and appeared in several television commercials. This led to guest roles in episodes of Skippy the Bush Kangaroo, police dramas The Link Men, The Long Arm, Homicide and Matlock Police produced by Crawford Productions. This culminated in the regular role of Senior Detective Phillip Redford in Crawford's series Homicide in 1973. Redford was a university graduate who had served as a bomb disposal expert in Vietnam, and was anti-violence as a result.

Day was the only cast member who appeared in all colour episodes of Homicide until it ceased production in 1975. Following this he appeared as a regular in Crawford's soap opera The Box as Marcus Boyd in 1977.

His other regular series role was as Detective Inspector Malcolm Thorne in Murder Call in 1997-98.

Guest roles include Cop Shop, Carson's Law, Blue Heelers, Halifax f.p., Dogs Head Bay.

Stage roles 
He played the major supporting role of George Witton (to Terence Donovan's leading role of Harry 'Breaker' Morant) in the first public performance of Kenneth G. Ross's important Australian play Breaker Morant: A Play in Two Acts, presented by the Melbourne Theatre Company at the Athenaeum Theatre, in Melbourne, Victoria, Australia, on Thursday, 2 February 1978.

TV Shows

Films

Awards

References

External links
 
 Gary Day — Classic Australian TV website interview

1941 births
Living people
AACTA Award winners
New Zealand male television actors
People from Christchurch